Morning Orbit is the second solo album released by Canadian musician David Usher. The album's lead single, "Alone in the Universe", was first made available for streaming in May 2001. The album was released on July 31, 2001 and was certified Platinum by the CRIA in April 2002. "Alone in the Universe" was the 35th most played song on radio in Canada in 2001. "Black Black Heart" and "A Day in the Life" were also released as singles, and both songs were among the top 100 most played songs on radio in Canada in 2002.

Track listing
"How Are You?"
"Too Close to the Sun"
"Black Black Heart"
"Alone in the Universe"
"Butterfly"
"Joy in Small Places"
"A Day in the Life"
"My Way Out"
"Blinded"
"Fast Car"
"Closer"
"Black Black Heart 2.0 (Bonus Track)"

Thai version

Disc 1
"Alone in the Universe" (Thai version)
"How Are You?" (Thai version)
"Joy in Small Places"
"Black Black Heart" (CHR mix)
"Fast Car"
"Butterfly"
"Too Close to the Sun"
"A Day in the Life"
"Blinded"
"My Way Out"
"Closer"
"Alone in the Universe"
"How Are You?"
"Black Black Heart 2.0"

Disc 2
Data track containing music videos for "Alone in the Universe," "My Way Out," "Black Black Heart" and "A Day in the Life"
"My Way Out" (Thai version)
"Alone in the Universe" (acoustic Thai version)
"Black Black Heart" (acoustic)
"My Way Out" (acoustic)

Trivia 
 Canadian rapper Snow is featured on the track "Joy in Small Places".
 "Black Black Heart 2.0" was co-produced by The Tea Party's Jeff Martin.
 Morning Orbit was the winner of the 2002 Juno Award for Best Pop Album.
 "Alone in the Universe" is featured on Big Shiny Tunes 6.
 "Black Black Heart" won two MuchMusic Video Awards for Best Post-Production and Best Pop Video in 2002.

Year-end charts

References

External links

2001 albums
David Usher albums
EMI Records albums
Albums recorded at Metalworks Studios
Juno Award for Pop Album of the Year albums